Nadhir Sloum Waleed Al-Maskari (born 9 August 1992), commonly known as Nadhir Sloum, is an Omani footballer who plays for Fanja SC.

Club career

On 28 July 2013, he moved to 2012–13 Oman Elite League runners-up Fanja SC on loan from Al-Nahda Club.

Club career statistics

International career
Nadhir is part of the first team squad of the Oman national football team. He was selected for the national team for the first time in 2012. He made his first appearance for Oman on 8 December 2012 against Lebanon in the 2012 WAFF Championship. He has made appearances in the 2012 WAFF Championship and the 2014 WAFF Championship and has represented the national team in the 2015 AFC Asian Cup qualification.

Honours

Club
With Al-Nahda
Sultan Qaboos Cup (0): Runner-up 2012
Omani Super Cup (1): 2009

With Fanja
Oman Professional League (0): Runner-up 2012-13; 2013-14
Sultan Qaboos Cup (1): 2013-14
Oman Professional League Cup (1): 2014-15
Oman Super Cup (0): Runner-up 2013, 2014

References

External links
 
 
 
 
 

1992 births
Living people
Omani footballers
Oman international footballers
Association football defenders
Al-Nahda Club (Oman) players
Fanja SC players
Oman Professional League players
Footballers at the 2010 Asian Games
Asian Games competitors for Oman
People from Ash Sharqiyah North Governorate